The 1900–01 Swiss Serie A season was the 1900–01 season of the Swiss national football league championship.

Overview 
The 1900–01 Swiss Serie A was divided into two groups, an east and a west group. The east group had three teams from Zürich, Grasshopper Club Zürich, FC Zürich, Fire Flies Zürich and three teams from Basel, FC Basel, Old Boys and Fortuna Basel. There were four teams in the west group, FC La Chaux-de-Fonds, Servette Genf, FC Neuchâtel and FC Bern. From the east group the Grasshoppers qualified themselves for the finals against FC Bern who were the winners of the east group.

The final was played on 31 March 1901 in Aarau, but a player from the Grasshopper Club was not-qualified and the result was voided and replayed. The replay was on 14 April, again in Aarau, and the Grasshopper Club won 2-0 and became Swiss Champions.

Qualification groups

East

West

Final 

|colspan="3" style="background-color:#D0D0D0" align=center|31 March 1901

|}
The final was voided and repeated because the Grasshopper fielded an unqualified player. 

Replay

|colspan="3" style="background-color:#D0D0D0" align=center|14 April 1901

|}

Grasshopper Club Zürich won the championship.

See also 
 1900–01 FC Basel season

Sources 
 Switzerland 1900-01 at RSSSF

Seasons in Swiss football
Swiss Football League seasons
1900–01 in Swiss football
Swiss